The commune of Rusaka is a commune of Mwaro Province in central Burundi. The capital lies at Mwaro (Rusaka). An agricultural commune, in recent years forest development in the commune has resulted in arid soils in parts.
In June 2003, FDD combatants killed three civilians and burned local government buildings and a cooperative in the commune.

References

Communes of Burundi
Mwaro Province